George Fries (1799November 13, 1866) was a physician and a two-term U.S. Representative from Ohio from 1845 to 1849.

Life and career 
Born in Pennsylvania in 1799, Fries attended the common schools. He studied medicine and commenced practice in Hanoverton, Ohio, in 1833.

Congress 
Fries was elected as a Democrat to the Twenty-ninth and Thirtieth Congresses (March 4, 1845–March 3, 1849). He declined to be a candidate for renomination in 1848.

Fries subsequently moved to Cincinnati, Ohio, and resumed the practice of medicine. He served as the treasurer of Hamilton County, Ohio from 1860-1862 during the first years of the American Civil War before retiring from public service.

Death 
He died in Cincinnati, Ohio, on November 13, 1866, and was interred in the Catholic Cemetery.

Sources

1799 births
1866 deaths
People from Hanoverton, Ohio
Politicians from Cincinnati
Physicians from Ohio
Democratic Party members of the United States House of Representatives from Ohio
19th-century American politicians